Kim Kilsdonk (born 31 March 1979) is a Dutch former professional tennis player.

In her career, she won one singles title and 30 doubles titles on the ITF Circuit. Her highest singles ranking is world No. 347, which she reached in February 1999. Her career-high in doubles is 144, achieved August 2005.

Kilsdonk made her WTA Tour main-draw debut 2003 at the indoor event in Paris, in the doubles event, partnering Sophie Lefèvre.

She retired from professional tennis in 2016.

Career
In October 2004, Kilsdonk partnered Leanne Baker and the duo lost in the semifinals of the Luxembourg Open. They were beaten in two sets by Jill Craybas and Marlene Weingärtner.

In February 2005, Kilsdonk partnered Claire Curran and the duo lost in the first round of the Open Gaz de France. They were beaten by Iveta Benešová and Květa Peschke. Following this, they headed to Antwerp to compete in the Proximus Diamond Games. There, they won two matches to qualify and then went on to beat Francesca Lubiani and Marta Marrero in the first round. They lost to Anabel Medina Garrigues and Dinara Safina in the quarterfinals, in straight sets. This was followed by a run to the semifinals at the İstanbul Cup partnering Claire Curran where they lost to Sandra and Daniela Klemenschits.

In October 2006, at Hasselt, Kilsdonk partnered Elise Tamaëla. The duo lost in the quarterfinals; they were beaten by Eleni Daniilidou and Jasmin Wöhr.

In September 2007, Kilsdonk partnered Sophie Lefèvre and the duo lost in the quarterfinals of the Guangzhou International Open to Anabel Medina Garrigues and Virginia Ruano Pascual.

ITF Circuit finals

Singles: 2 (1 title, 1 runner-up)

Doubles: 55 (30 titles, 25 runner-ups)

References

External links
 
 

1979 births
Living people
Dutch female tennis players
Sportspeople from Haarlem
20th-century Dutch women
21st-century Dutch women